The following highways are numbered 175:

Canada
 Prince Edward Island Route 175
  Quebec Route 175

Costa Rica
 National Route 175

Japan
 Japan National Route 175

Mexico
 Mexican Federal Highway 175

United States
 Interstate 175
 U.S. Route 175
 Alabama State Route 175
 Arkansas Highway 175
 Arkansas Highway 175 Spur
 California State Route 175
 Connecticut Route 175
 Florida State Road 175
 Georgia State Route 175 (former)
 Illinois Route 175 (former)
 Iowa Highway 175
 K-175 (Kansas highway)
 Kentucky Route 175
 Louisiana Highway 175
 Maine State Route 175
 Maryland Route 175
 M-175 (Michigan highway) (former)
 Minnesota State Highway 175
 Missouri Route 175
 New Hampshire Route 175
 New Hampshire Route 175A
 New Jersey Route 175
 New Mexico State Road 175
 New York State Route 175
New York State Route 175X
 North Carolina Highway 175
 Ohio State Route 175
 Tennessee State Route 175
 Texas State Highway 175
 Farm to Market Road 175 (Texas)
 Utah State Route 175 (former)
 Virginia State Route 175
 Wisconsin Highway 175
 Wyoming Highway 175
Territories
 Puerto Rico Highway 175